This is a comprehensive list of awards and nominations won by Nelly Furtado, a Canadian singer. Since beginning her career, Furtado has received 57 awards from 146 nominations.

Furtado's first single, "I'm like a Bird", from her debut album Whoa, Nelly!, earned her the Best Female Pop Vocal Performance at the 2002 Grammy Awards, a Juno award, and Best Pop New Artist Clip at the Billboard Music Video Awards.

Her second album, Folklore (2003), wasn't successful saleswise, but it still earned her a Juno award and 5 other nominations.

Loose, the third album, was the most successful album of her career. She won a Best International Female Solo Artist at the 2007 BRIT Awards, a Best Pop Collaboration with Vocals nomination at the 2007 Grammy Awards, and an Album of the Year award at the MTV Europe Music Awards.

American Music Awards

Belgian TMF Awards

Billboard Music Awards 

|-
|rowspan="4"|2006
|rowspan="4"| Promiscuous
|Hot 100 Single of the Year
|rowspan="2" 
|-
|Digital Song of the Year
|-
| Pop 100 Single of the Year
|
|-
| Pop 100 Airplay Song of the Year
|
|}

Billboard Music Video Awards

Billboard Latin Music Awards

BRIT Awards

Canada Walk of Fame 

|-
|2010
|Herself
|Walk of Fame
|
|}

Canadian Civil Liberties Association Awards 

|-
|2013
|Herself
|Excellence in the Arts
|
|}

Canadian Music and Broadcast Industry Awards 

|-
|2016
|Herself
|Allan Slaight Humanitarian Spirit Award
|
|}

Cyprus Music Awards 

|-
|rowspan="2"|2012
|rowspan="2"|Herself
|Best Canadian Artist
|
|-
|Best Latin Artist
|
|}

Danish Music Awards 

|-
|2002
|Herself
|Foreign Newcomer of the Year
|
|-
|2008
|Say It Right
|rowspan=2|Foreign Hit of the Year
|rowspan=2 
|-
|2008
|All Good Things (Come to an End)
|}

Echo Music Awards 

|-
|2002
|rowspan="3"|Herself
|Best International Newcomer
|rowspan="4" 
|-
|2005
|rowspan="2"|Best International Pop/Rock Female
|-
|rowspan="2"|2007
|-
|All Good Things (Come To End)
|Best International Song
|-
|rowspan="3"|2008
|Herself
|Best International Pop/Rock Female
|
|-
|Say It Right
|Best International Song
|rowspan="2" 
|-
|Loose
|Best International Album
|}

Eska Awards 

|-
|2013
|Herself
|Radio Eska Award
|
|}

Festival de Viña del Mar

Grammy Awards 

|-
|rowspan="4"| 
| Nelly Furtado
|  Best New Artist
|rowspan="2" 
|-|
|rowspan="2"| "I'm Like a Bird"
|  Song of the Year
|-
| Best Female Pop Vocal Performance
|
|-|
|rowspan="1"| "Whoa, Nelly!
|  Best Pop Vocal Album
| rowspan="4" 
|-|
| rowspan="1"|
| rowspan="1"| "Promiscuous" (with Timbaland)
| rowspan="2"| Best Pop Collaboration with Vocals
|-
| rowspan="2"|
| rowspan="1"|"Give It To Me" (with Timbaland and Justin Timberlake)
|-
| "Say It Right"
| Best Female Pop Vocal Performance

Latin Grammy Awards

German Sustainability Award

International Dance Music Awards

Juno Awards

MTV Asia Awards

MTV Australia Video Music Awards

MTV Europe Music Awards

MTV Video Music Awards

MTV VMA Awards Latinoamerica

Music Video Production Awards 

|-
| 2005
| "Try"
| Best Hair
| 
|}

My VH1 Music Awards

MuchMusic Video Awards

Native American Music Awards 

|-
|2013
|Herself
|Living Legend Award
|
|}

NAACP Image Awards 

|-
|2002
|Herself
|Outstanding New Artist
|
|}

NRJ Music Awards

Teen Choice Awards

West Coast Music Awards

Premios 40 Principales

Premios Lo Nuestro

People Choice Awards

Oye! Awards

Q Awards

Radio Music Awards

Socan Music Awards

Swiss Music Awards

The Record of the Year 

{| class="wikitable"
|-
!Year
!Award
!Nominated
!Result
|-
| 2006
| "Maneater"
| rowspan="2"|Record of the Year
| rowspan="2" 
|-
| 2009
| "Broken Strings" (with James Morrison)

World Music Awards

References 

Awards
Furtado, Nelly